The Further Adventures of Lucky Jim  ( The New Adventures of Lucky Jim) is a British television sitcom which first aired on BBC 2 in 1982. It is inspired by the 1954 novel Lucky Jim by Kingsley Amis, updated to the Swinging Sixties. It was intended as a sequel to the 1967 series of the same name also written by Dick Clement and Ian La Frenais, which had starred Keith Barron in the title role.

Actors who appeared in individual episodes include Miranda Richardson, Clive Swift, Antony Sher, Tony Haygarth, Albert Moses, Trevor Bannister, Tim Barrett, Timothy Carlton, Geoffrey Chater and Wanda Ventham.

Synopsis
In 1967 returning from a year abroad, university lecturer Jim Dixon is determined to get into the spirit of the times.

Main cast
 Enn Reitel as Jim Dixon
 Glynis Barber as Lucy Simmons
 David Simeon as Philip Lassiter
 Barbara Flynn as Joanna Lassiter
 Nick Stringer as George Bowles
 Debbie Wheeler as Susan
 Peter Hughes as Mr. Dixon
 Margery Mason as Mrs. Dixon
 Jane Myerson as Penny Davenport

References

Bibliography
 Horace Newcomb. Encyclopedia of Television. Routledge, 2014.

External links
 

BBC television sitcoms
1982 British television series debuts
1982 British television series endings
1980s British comedy television series
English-language television shows